This is a list of the preserved important Colonial government and civil buildings  in Mexico City, the capital of Mexico.

Mexico City was traditionally known as La Ciudad de los Palacios ("the City of the Palaces"), a nickname attributed to Baron Alexander von Humboldt when visiting the city in the 19th century.

Aside from being a notable city in colonial times, the city grew in the 20th century enormously in terms of population, adhering to over a hundred of suburbs close to the city (former suburbs today called "pueblos originarios" or "colonias").

List

See also
List of colonial churches in Mexico City
List of archaeological sites in Mexico City
Baroque art in Mexico
New Spanish Baroque

References

 
Mexico City
History of Mexico City

Mexico
Mexico City